The Terai–Madhesh Loktantrik Party is a political party in Nepal. Although the party's primary base is still in Terai Madhesh of Madhesh Province only, it has tried to expand its throughout Terai and Tharuhath regions of Nepal.

The party was officially registered at Election Commission on 13 December 2021. Brikhesh Chandra Lal is the chairman of the party and former member of constituent assembly, Bijay Kumar Singh is the senior leader of the party.

History  
The party was officially registered on 3 December 2021 for the second time under the name.

Later it was reported that senior leaders Brikhesh Chandra Lal and Bijay Kumar Singh had played role in registering the party under the chairmanship of Ravi Shankar Karna (Subhash). Karna who previously served as the deputy chairman of student's union of old Terai Madhesh Loktantrik Party. Similarly leader Lal and Singh were active as central committee member of Loktantrik Samajwadi Party, Nepal. They were also the founding leader of previously Mahantha Thakur led Terai Madhesh Loktantrik Party (Defunct). They had left Nepali Congress along with Thakur to form the party.

On 22 February 2021, hundreds of party caders and leaders from Loktantrik Samajwadi Party, Nepal led by Lal and Dr Singh joined the party. Among them were Ramji Ray, Dhirendra Bahadur Singh, Satis Lal Das, Yogendra Rai, Umesh Mandal and Mohammad Asgar Ali. This created a huge loss to former party organization in Dhanusha and Mahottari district.

Party expansion and electoral performance 
The party won several seats in eastern terai and won several ward chairs in Janakpur, Mahottari rural municipality and other munucipalities. Similarly, the party won chairperson of Mahottari Rural Municipality which lies in Mahottari 3 which remains the election concituency of Mahantha Thakur. This was seen as a major success of the party as the party was able to divert traditional vote bank of Janata Samajwadi Party and Loktantrik  Samajwadi Party ending their monopoly in the Madhesh province.

Electoral performance

Local election

Leadership

Chairman 

 Brikhesh Chandra Lal (2021-present)

Senior leader 

 Bijay Kumar Singh (2021-present)

See also 

 Terai Madhesh Loktantrik Party (2007)
 Brikhesh Chandra Lal
 Bijay Kumar Singh
 2022 Provincial Assembly of Madhesh Province election

References 

Socialist parties in Nepal
Social democratic parties in Nepal
2021 establishments in Nepal
Madhesh Province